Aleksandër Peçi (born Tirana, 11 July 1951) is an Albanian composer; who has received high acclaim on national and international level 

He has received his education from institutions and cities such as Conservatoire National Supérieur de Musique et de Danse de Paris, Amsterdam, Academia Santa Cecilia, and the University of Arts, Tirana working with acclaimed musicians like Çesk Zadeja, in Paris with Ton de Leeuw, Paul Mefano, Jacques Charpentier. In Amsterdam Peçi has studied with Daan Manneke, Conservatorium van Amsterdam and Conservatorio Santa Cecilia to write Etera Tondo after Paradis of Dante Alighieri. then worked as the director of Palace of Culture in Përmet; from 1979 he was the artistic director of the National Ensemble of Popular Songs and Dances. Since 1986 he has been a full-time composer. In 1989 he composed the song Toka E Diellit which won the major Albanian music contest, Festivali i Këngës. Since 1992 he has taught at the Academy of Fine Arts in Tirana.

Career 
In his professional career as a composer he has written over 922 compositions and Editions, 35 CD albums of his music have been published. On his youtube channel there are more than 622 videos of his music performances.

Aleksandër Peçi has participated in over 80 highly-acclaimed international festivals of contemporary music, including the Venice Biennale, Manchester International Festival, Festival of Marseille, ISCM World Music Days, Moscow Autumn, EMU in Santa Cecilia Festival, Seattle Festival, Summer Fest Moscow, Nuova Musica Brno, Convergence Fest Prague, and Festival of Hong Kong. His music has been premiered and successfully performed internationally in Carnegie Hall (New York), Steinway Piano Gallery (Miami), EuroPianos (Naples, Florida), Clarke Recital Hall (University of Miami), and Prague Conservatory.

Aleksandër Peçi collaborates on a regular basis with world-renowned names of the contemporary music scene from Italy, Russia, Netherlands, Bulgaria, England, France, and USA. He has received commissions from numerous institutions such as the Ministry of Culture (Albania), Radio France music, Ministry of Culture France SACEM (France), Montreal Film Studio, Albanian Film Studios and Radio Television Orchestra Albania. The year 2011 marked Peçi’s world-wide tour where his music was performed extensively in Moscow, Paris, Texas, Ecuador, Louisiana, Armenia, Oman, Kosovo.

In August of 2016, the Moscow Conservatory presented a first-time event featuring his Five Piano Sonatas. One of Peçi’s piano works that most evidently represents his aesthetic take on kabaizm is “Muzikë Kabaistike,” which received its world premiere by Redi Llupa at the Kaleidoscope MusArt Concert Series in Miami, FL in February 2016.

Mr. Peçi has ventured into various fields of musical expression including those of movie soundtracks, symphonic, ballet, and operatic settings, chamber music, as well as solo piano, among many others.

Awards and titles  
Aleksander Peçi was awarded the title of Merited Artist in 1989. In 2011, the President of The Republic of Albania, Bamir Topi, granted him the title Grand Master, with the written motivation: “For outstanding contributions to the modernization of thought and image of the Albanian composition, composer of a wider dimension, analyst, researcher and author of a series of musical works, with specific values in the History of National Culture.” Other awards include the ones from Radio France, and SACEM in France, Montreal Film Studio in Canada, and the Venice Biennale. Aleksandër Peçi is the winner of 21 National and International Prizes, including Special Award at the “KULT” 2011 and those at the 1979 Albanian Film Festival with Gjeneral Gramafoni; the ’89 festival with Toka e diellit; and the 2000 festival with Dasma e Sakos; as well as the First Prize for the Rhapsody No. 2 for violin and orchestra at the 1975 Koncertet e Majit, Tirana; First Prize for the ballet Kecat dhe ujku at the 1978 National competition honoring the 35th Anniversary of the National Army; First Prize at the 1981 Koncertet e Majit, Tirana, with the song Rritim jetën tonë; Special Prize awarded at the 1982 Balkan Film Festival in Istanbul for the music of Gjeneral Gramafoni; Second Prize at the 1988 Festivali i Këngës në RTSH with the song Në emër të jetës; First Prize at the 1989 Festivali i këngës në RTSH for the song Toka e Diellit; First Prize at the 2002 “Muza” National Competition under the auspices of the Albanian Ministry of Culture for Heteroondulation special (work commissioned by Radio France) and at the 2003 one for the opera OIRAT. In 2003, he was also the winner of the Silver Remi Award at the Houston - Texas World Fest for the music of Women without wings (produced by Cinestudio - Montreal, Canada). In 2021 has won first price with sonata no.2 for violoncello Mitosfera and first price in Germany with the film Ritrato infinito di Clara Bellini – production Italo - Albanese.

Selected recordings 
Peçi’s rich output includes stage and orchestral works such as 20 film scores, 2 opera, 5 symphonies,  2 ballets,  13  concertos 6 for cello and orchestra; 5 for piano and orchestra), 6 rhapsodies, 1 poem, Planetears for string ensemble, soprano, flute and piano, and 60 works for string orchestra. 20 sonatas. Hi are working in totale for 45 sonatas (30 for piano 10 for violin, 3 for cello, 2 for clarinet)
His chamber and solo compositions are Liturgji në Token time, for 3 sopranos, choir, and symphonic orchestra (text based on prayers of Mother Teresa), 2 volumes of accordion works, 120 compositions for solo piano, 1 volume of choral music, 1 volume for soprano and piano, and electroacoustic music.
Koncert per piano dhe orkester nr. 1 = Concerto for Piano and orchestra, nr. 1, 1976
Kecat dhe ujku = The Goats And The Wolf, balley, 1979
Koncert per Violoncel dhe orkester = Concerto for Violoncello and orchestra, 1982
Sinfoni nr. 1 = Symphony nr. 1, 1985
Sinfoni nr. 2 = Symphony nr. 2, 1988
Oirat, 2000
12 Cartesius Cantus, piano cycle, 2002
Etera tonda, acoustic and electro-acoustic music, + installation, 2006
Piano concerto nr. 2, 2007
Besides these he composed rhapsodies, movie soundtracks, pieces for piano, pieces for voice and some electroacoustic music.

References

External links
Detailed biography of Aleksandër Peçi (French)
Biography of Aleksandër Peçi (French)
Cinema Italiano
Elida Dakolli book
Broken Song CD
Youtube channel Aleksander Peci
Tingujt kabaistike ne Viene 
Redi Llupa Aleksander Peci muzike kabaistike

1951 births
Living people
Albanian composers
Male composers
Musicians from Tirana